Lê Trung Tông (chữ Hán: 黎中宗, 1535 – 24 January 1556), birth name Lê Huyên (黎暄), imperial name Vũ Hoàng đế, was the 13th emperor of Vietnamese Later Lê Dynasty, reigned from 1548 to 1556. He succeeded Lê Trang Tông (1533–1548) and was succeeded by Lê Anh Tông (1556–1573). Though power remained with the Nguyen Lords having seized control of the southern part of the country up to Thanh Hoa since 1545, and the north divided between the last emperors of the Mạc dynasty and the Trịnh Lords.

Sources 

 Đại Việt Thông Sử, Lê Quý Đôn (1759)

1535 births
1556 deaths
Lê dynasty emperors
Vietnamese monarchs